The Mayor of Taoyuan is the chief executive of the Taoyuan City Government. Taoyuan City is a special municipality of the Republic of China (Taiwan). It was formerly known as the magistrate of Taoyuan before 25 December 2014 when Taoyuan was still a county. This list includes directly elected magistrates of the county during that time period.

Titles of the Mayor

List of Mayors

Magistrates of Taoyuan County

Mayors of Taoyuan City (special municipality)

Timeline

See also
 Taoyuan City Government
 Taoyuan Aerotropolis

Notes

External links 
 
 Taoyuan County Government 
 B-ROCcty

 
Taoyuan
Taoyuan
Magistrates of Taoyuan County